Kujan  (German Kujan) is a village in the administrative district of Gmina Zakrzewo, within Złotów County, Greater Poland Voivodeship, in west-central Poland.

Before 1772, the area was part of the Kingdom of Poland. For more on its history, see Złotów County.

The village has a population of 220.

References

Kujan